Andrew Polycarpou (born 15 August 1958) is an English former professional footballer who played as a midfielder. He began his career with Southend United, making over 60 appearances in all competitions and winning promotion on two occasions with the club. He joined Cambridge United in 1981 but persistent injury problems led to him moving to Cardiff City in April 1982. He made seven appearances as the club suffered relegation and he was released at the end of the season.

References

1958 births
Living people
English footballers
Footballers from Islington (district)
Southend United F.C. players
Cambridge United F.C. players
Cardiff City F.C. players
English Football League players
Association football midfielders